A Man For The Weekend is a 2017 Cameroonian romantic comedy movie  produced by Syndy Emade featuring Nollywood  actor  Alexx Ekubo.

Plot
A Man For The Weekend  tells us the story of Candace Ayuk (Candy),  a young  business executive. Driven by her career, she has no time for the pleasure of life, much to the chagrin of her mother who want to see her settle down. This drive wedge between the two as Candy finds herself avoiding her mother's calls for obvious reasons  to find a man just to please her mother but sad, the man she found as the perfect one to  present  to her mom turned out to be a fraud.

Cast
 Syndy Emade as Candy
 Alexx Ekubo as Bryan Mbah 
 Nchifor Valery as Richard Mbome
 Solange Ojong as Christelle Ayuk
 Miss Lee as Mrs. Ayuk

Release
A Man For The Weekend was released in October, 2017.

Reception
Cameroon celebrity websites consider the movie as the first international debut of Syndy Emade's own production inviting Nollywood star  Alexx Ekubo.

See also
 List of Cameroonian films
 Cinema of Nigeria

References

Cameroonian comedy films
2017 films
2017 comedy films
English-language Cameroonian films
2010s English-language films